Ministry of Electricity and Energy (abbreviated as MOEE) was the ministry of Myanmar composed by two ministries, Electrical Power (MOEP) and Energy (MOE) by President Htin Kyaw. It was reconstituted as MOEP and MOE in May 2022 by SAC.

History
In 2016, newly elected president Htin Kyaw combined Ministry of Electric Power and Ministry of Energy  as Ministry of Electricity and Energy.

In 2022 May, SAC reconstituted the ministry as Ministry of Electric Power and Ministry of Energy.

Ministers 
Aung San Suu Kyi (March 2016- April 2016)
Pe Zin Tun (April 2016- August 2017)
Win Khine (August 2017- February 2021)
Aung Than Oo (February 2021- 2 May 2022)

Departments
Union Minister Office 
Oil and Gas Planning Department 
Myanmar Oil and Gas Enterprise
Myanmar Petrochemical Enterprise
Myanmar Petroleum Products Enterprise
Department of Electric Power Planning
Department of Hydropower Implementation
Department of Electric Power Transmission and System Control
Electricity Supply Enterprise  
Electric Power Generation Enterprise 
Yangon Electricity Supply Corporation  
Mandalay Electricity Supply Corporation

References

External links

ElectricityandEnergy
Myanmar
Energy in Myanmar